Ashley Philip Chandrasinghe (born 17 December, 2001) is an Australian cricketer of Sri Lankan origin who plays first-
class cricket for the Victoria cricket team. He is a left handed batsman.

Career
He made his debut for Casey-South Melbourne Cricket Club in the 2019-20 season and marked his debut with a century. He made his debut for the Victoria Second XI in November 2021. He played cricket in Darwin when Victoria was out of season. In August 2022 Chandrasinghe set a new record by hitting five consecutive centuries in the Darwin Premier League. Such was his form with Waratah he was awarded the Ralph Wiese Medal in September 2022.

Chandrasinghe was awarded a rookie contract with Victoria for the 2022-23 after his 2021-22 season with the Victorian Second XI saw he score 423 runs at an average of 84.60. He made his first-class debut for Victoria on 28 October, 2022 in the Sheffield Shield against Tasmania at the Blundstone Arena, Hobart. He replaced Will Pucovski in the side. He finished day one 63 not out after sharing a 157-run partnership for the third wicket with Victoria captain Peter Handscomb. On the second day he completed his debut century and finished 119 not out as Victoria declared on 7/351.

On December 29 2022, he made his debut for Australia in their Boxing Day Test Match against the South African cricket team. He came on as a fielding replacement for Nathan Lyon, and was in the field for about 5 seconds before coming off for Lance Morris.

Personal life

He is of Sri Lankan ancestry.

References

External links
 

2001 births
Living people
Australian cricketers
Cricketers from Melbourne
Victoria cricketers
Australian people of Sri Lankan descent